The Walt Disney Hometown Museum is located in the restored Santa Fe Railway Depot in Marceline, Missouri.  Opened in 2001, the museum houses a collection of memorabilia from the Disney family's farm where they lived from 1905 to 1909 along with Walt Disney's return to the town in 1946.

Many of the items were donated by the family of Ruth Flora Disney Beecher, Walt's sister.  Artifacts include personal family letters and photos, Disney's wooden school desk and a recording of him asking his parents about their life. The museum houses the only remaining components of a Disneyland ride to be operated outside of Disneyland, the Autopia.  The museum also houses artifacts from the town's railroad history, including ATSF 5008, an EMD SD40 built in 1966.

In 2015, the museum launched a project to recreate the Autopia attraction that had operated in the Walt Disney Municipal Park south of town.  The miniature car ride was donated by Disney when the attraction was dismantled at Disneyland.  The town operated the ride from 1966 until rising insurance costs and a lack of replacement parts forced its closure in 1977. A single restored car is on display at the museum and was the centerpiece of a Kickstarter project to finance a $500,000 reconstruction of the ride, launched in July 2015.

See also

Rail transport in Walt Disney Parks and Resorts

References

Museums in Linn County, Missouri
Disney
Walt Disney
Museums established in 2001
2001 establishments in Missouri
Former Amtrak stations in Missouri
Railway stations closed in 1997
Atchison, Topeka and Santa Fe Railway stations